Association football (soccer) is the most popular sport in Equatorial Guinea. It was during the Spanish colonialism that football arrived to Equatorial Guinea. Football is now a very popular sport in the country. Recently the national team has made a few surprising results. In the qualification for the FIFA World Cup in 2006 Togo (who later qualified for the World Cup) was beaten 1-0, and in the qualification for the African Cup of Nations they beat Cameroon 1-0.

Equatorial Guinea co-hosted the 2012 Africa Cup of Nations with Gabon, and was the host of the 2015 Africa Cup of Nations.

League system

Equatorial Guinea football stadiums

References